Salzwedel (officially known as Hansestadt Salzwedel; Low German: Soltwedel) is a town in Saxony-Anhalt, Germany.  It is the capital of the district (Kreis) of Altmarkkreis Salzwedel, and has a population of approximately 21,500. Salzwedel is located on the German Timber-Frame Road.

Geography
Salzwedel is situated at the river Jeetze in the northwestern part of the Altmark. It is located between Hamburg and Magdeburg.  Distances from Uelzen are  E,  S of Lüchow,  N of Gardelegen and  W of Arendsee. In 1968 test drillings revealed a significant reservoir of natural gas near the city.

Divisions 
The town Salzwedel consists of Salzwedel proper and the following Ortschaften or municipal divisions:

Andorf
Barnebeck
Brietz
Chüden
Dambeck
Henningen
Klein Gartz
Langenapel
Liesten
Mahlsdorf
Osterwohle
Pretzier
Riebau
Seebenau
Stappenbeck
Steinitz
Tylsen

History
The castle of Salzwedel in the Altmark was first documented in 1112. As part of the Margraviate of Brandenburg, the settlement was first mentioned as a town in 1233. To the northeast of the old town (Altstadt), a new town (Neustadt) began development in 1247. In the Middle Ages Salzwedel belonged to the Hanseatic League from 1263 to 1518. As to religion Salzwedel belonged to the Diocese of Verden (till 1648).

The city from 1247 began developing as a reestablishment from the old part of the town. In 1701 it became part of the Kingdom of Prussia. In 1713, the two towns Altstadt and Neustadt became one. Salzwedel became part of the Prussian Province of Saxony in 1815 after the Napoleonic Wars. In 1870 it received a railroad connection. The medieval part of the town remains the commercial and administrative center of the town until today.

As in other German cities during the time of Nazi Germany under Adolf Hitler, the Jewish residents of the city were systematically deprived of their rights, then expelled from the city. Salzwedel was hit by five air raids from 1942-1945, and more than 300 people lost their lives, especially on 22 February 1945.

In 1943, the Neuengamme concentration camp built a female subcamp in Salzwedel, capable of holding more than 1,000 female prisoners. Eventually more than 3,000 women were held there, both Jews and non-Jews. The guard staff at the camp included sixty SS men and women.  One Aufseherin is known today by name, Lieselotte Darnstaedt, who was born in 1908.  Darnstaedt also served at Ravensbrück before coming to Salzwedel. On April 29, 1945, the US Army liberated the Salzwedel women's subcamp, and also a men's camp nearby for male non-German political prisoners.  They were shocked to find more than ninety corpses of women who had died of typhus, dysentery and malaria. At the beginning of 1945, prior to the arrival of American ground forces, Allied war planes attacked the main train station of Salzwedel, killing 300 people. The US Army eventually turned over control of the city to the Soviet Red Army, causing Salzwedel to become part of the German Democratic Republic.

On November 9, 1989 the East-West German border crossing near Salzwedel was opened, along with East-West border crossings in the rest of the country, allowing East Germans residing in Salzwedel and elsewhere to travel freely to West Germany for the first time since the building of the Berlin Wall. In 1990 Salzwedel received its first democratically elected city government.

The official name of the city was changed into Hansestadt Salzwedel on 1 April 2008, in reference to its history as a member of the Hanseatic League.

In January 2003 the town incorporated the former municipalities Brietz, Dambeck and Mahlsdorf, in January 2009 Benkendorf, in January 2010 Chüden, Klein Gartz, Langenapel, Liesten, Osterwohle, Pretzier, Riebau, Seebenau and Tylsen, and in January 2011 Steinitz and Wieblitz-Eversdorf.

Population development

 1998 – 20,614
 1999 – 20,499
 2000 – 20,349
 2001 – 20,130
 2002 – 19,926
 2003 – 21,360
 2004 – 21,070
 2005 – 21,316
 2006 – 20,777
 2015 – 24,410

Mayors
Sabine Danicke (independent) was elected as the mayor in 2008. From January 2011 she was the Lord Mayor. Since March 2016 Sabine Blümel is the Lord Mayor.

Culture and sights

Main sights

Salzwedel's sites of interest include the historic part of town, encompassed by the historic city wall and town gates. The city also contains the birth house of Jenny von Westphalen, later the wife of Karl Marx.
 numerous half-timbered houses
 town gates: Neuperver Gate built 1460-1470, Stonegate built around 1530, and medieval city fortifications with Hungerturm Tower and the Kluhs, a store house dating from 1490 built on the wall
 remains of a castle (Castle Tower and Garden)
 Townhall (former monastery)
 Townhall Tower
 The Monk Church
 gothic Brickchurches St.Marien, St.Katharina und St.Lorenz
 another churches: St. Georg and Holy-Spirit-Church
 former Townhall, today's local court of Salzwedel
 Fairy-Tale Garden
 Johann-Friedrich-Danneil-Museum
 "Baumkuchen" Bakeries

Festivals
 Parkfestival, music event taking part in a 2-year-rhythm with the participation of national and international artists like Die Prinzen, Nina Hagen, Joe Cocker, Reamon, Heather Nova, Leningrad Cowboys, Madsen, Blackmail, City and so on.
 Smack-Festival, one of the biggest Hard-Rock-Festivals in Saxony-Anhalt.

Cuisine
The delicacies of the town are Baumkuchen, Salzwedeler (Altmärker) Wedding-Soup and Tiegelbraten (mutton).

Transport
Salzwedel is accessed by route 71 (north to south) and 248 (west to east).
Salzwedel station is on the Stendal–Uelzen railway, part of the America Line (Amerikalinie), which was restored in the 1990s linking Berlin and Bremen.  The line connects Stendal and Uelzen.  Other stations are in Wittenberge near Arendsee and in Oebisfelde.

Notable people

 Balthasar Christian Bertram (died 1787), violinist and composer
 Heinz Billing (1914-2017), Freeman, a physicist and pioneer of computer development and in the exploration of gravitational waves
 Andy Böhme (born 1970), skeleton pilot
 Klaus Decker (born 1952), football player
 Doris Maletzki (born 1952), sprinter
 Friedrich Meinecke (1862–1954), historian
 Michel Niemeyer (born 1995), football player
 Stephan Praetorius (1536–1604), pastor
 Jürgen Scharf (born 1952), politician (CDU)
 Kurt Schütte (1909–1998), German mathematician
 Peter Urie (1955-2005), priest and bishop in the Republic of Kazakhstan
 Jenny von Westphalen (1814–1881), wife of Karl Marx
 Lorenz Weinrich (born 1929), German historian

People associated with Salzwedel

 Wilhelm Harnisch (1787–1864), educator and writer, visited the school and described Salzwedel  in  My life Morning 
 Hermann Hager (1816–1897), chemist and pharmacist, pharmacist teaching in Löwenapotheke
 Friedrich Ludwig Jahn (1778–1852), father of gymnastics, attended high school Salzwedel
 Reinhard Jirgl (born 1953), writer, lived from 1953 to 1964 with grandparents in Salzwedel
 Hermann Masius (1818–1893), educator, school teacher temporarily in Salzwedel
 Siegfried Schneider (born 1946), politician, mayor and city manager of Salzwedel

International relations

Salzwedel is twinned with:
 Wesel, Germany, since 1990
 San Vito dei Normanni, Italy, since 1990
 Felixstowe, United Kingdom, since 1994

References

External links

 

Towns in Saxony-Anhalt
Salzwedel
Altmarkkreis Salzwedel
Holocaust locations in Germany